Shaheen Akhtar (born 1962) is a Bangladeshi writer.

She was born in Comilla and studied economics at Dhaka University. She next studied and worked at film-making in India, returning to Bangladesh in 1991. She used to write short stories when she was younger.  Her first novel was Palabar Path Nei (No Escape Route), a story that explored the life of two single women in Dhaka,. Shaheen’s second novel Talaash won the Prothom Alo Best Book of the Year Award for 2004. For this novel She also won the 3rd Asian Literary Award-2020, a major prize in South Korea, Talaash (Eng: The Search, trans. Ella Dutta), translated into Korean by Seung Hee Jeon. Talaash (The Search) is about birangana (literally heroic women) of Bangladesh - women who were raped during the liberation war in 1971.

Her short stories have been published in Words without Border and other prestigious literary magazines. Shaheen’s works have been translated into English, German, and Korean. 

She works as an editor in the Media and Communication Unit of Ain o Salish Kendra, a civil rights organization in Dhaka

Selected works 
Talaash     (The Search), novel, translated into English in 2011
Shokhi Rongomala     (Beloved Rongomala), novel, translated into English in 2018
Moyur Shinghashon (Peacock Throne),     novel
Ashukhi din (Unhappy days), novel
Boner Shange Amarloke     (Sisters in eternity), short stories
Poneroti Golpo     (Fifteen stories), short stories
Shish o Onnyanno Golpo, short stories
Soti O Swotontora: Bangla Shahitye Nari, editor
Zenana Mehfil: Bangali Musalman Lekhikader Nirbachita     Rachana, 1904-1938     (Women in Concert: An Anthology of Bengali Muslim Women's Writings,     1904–1938), editor with Mousumi Bhowmik

Awards
Bangla Academy Literary Award (2015)
Asian Literary award (2020)
Gemcon Literary Award (2019) 
Akhteruzzaman Elias Kothashahitya Puroshkar 2015 
 IFIC Bank Puroshkar2015

References 

1962 births
Living people
Bangladeshi short story writers
Bangladeshi women novelists
Recipients of Bangla Academy Award
University of Dhaka alumni
21st-century Bangladeshi writers
21st-century Bangladeshi women writers
21st-century novelists
People from Comilla District